Luz María Román García (born 22 August 1969) is a Peruvian former footballer who played as a midfielder. She has been a member of the Peru women's national team.

International career
Román capped for Peru at senior level during the 2003 South American Women's Football Championship.

References

External links

1969 births
Living people
Peruvian women's footballers
Peru women's international footballers
Women's association football midfielders